650th Regional Support Group is a United States Army Reserve unit which controls a Combat Sustainment Support Battalion and Transportation units within California and Nevada. The current Commander for this unit is Colonel (United States) David G. Nowicki. COL Nowicki is a Logistics officer.

Units
The command is made up of the following units:
 469th Combat Sustainment Support Battalion
 469th Headquarters and Headquarters Detachment (CSS) 
 729th Transportation Company (Medium Truck)(Cargo)(Echelons above corps) 
 924th Transportation Detachment (Trailer Transfer Platoon) 
 923rd Transportation Detachment (Trailer Transfer Platoon)  
 227th Transportation Company (Cargo Transfer)(Improved Cargo Handling Operations) 
 728th Transportation Company (Medium Truck)(Palletized Load System) 
 483rd Transportation Battalion
 483rd Headquarters and Headquarters Detachment (Terminal) 
 481st Transportation Company Boat (Heavy)  
 711th Transportation Company (Seaport Operations)  
 201st Transportation Detachment (Harbormaster)  
 238th Transportation Company (Cargo Transfer)(Improved Cargo Handling Operations) 
 932nd Transportation Detachment (Trailer Transfer Platoon) 
 314th Transportation Battalion
 314th Headquarters and Headquarters Detachment (CSS) 
 645th Transportation Company (Cargo Transfer)(Improved Cargo Handling Operations) 
 257th Transportation Company (Combat Heavy Equipment Transporter) 
 948th Transportation Detachment (Movement Control)(Area) 
 957th Transportation Detachment (Movement Control)(Area)

References

Support groups of the United States Army